Danish International Development Agency (DANIDA) is the brand used by the Ministry of Foreign Affairs of Denmark when it provides humanitarian aid and development assistance to other countries, with focus on developing countries. There is no distinct Danida organisation within the Ministry.

Origin of name
The organisation's name was originally DANAID. In Greek mythology, the Danaids were daughters of Danaus who killed their husbands and were condemned to fill a bathtub with water to wash away their sins. Because the buckets they were given to do this were actually sieves, they worked for all eternity in Tartarus without making any progress. For this reason, the aid agency's name was changed from DANAID to DANIDA at the last minute when this unfortunate connotation was discovered. The term Danida appeared in 1963.

Overview
Denmark has been granting development assistance since the end of the Second World War. It is one of the five countries in the world that meets the United Nations' target of granting 0.7% of gross national income (GNI) in development assistance. In 2011 Denmark disbursed roughly DKK:15.753 billion (US$2.98 billion) in development assistance to countries in Africa, Asia, Latin America, the Middle East, and Denmark's European Union neighbors. Furthermore, DANIDA works in collaboration with many Danish NGOs such as Global Medical Aid. According to the OECD, 2020 official development assistance from Denmark increased 0.5% to USD 2.6 billion.

Focus areas 
DANIDA focusses on four areas of interest:
 Human rights and democracy
 Green growth 
 Social progress 
 Stability and protection.

As of 2015, DANIDA was involved in a total of 73 countries and regions across the world, with 21 countries of high priority. Most of the priority countries are among the poorest of the world, located in Africa and Asia.

The sectors receiving the largest amount of financial bilateral support is government and civil society, and humanitarian aid, at roughly 28% and 14% respectively.

Most of the goals of DANIDA's projects gets fulfilled, with an annual success rate between 79% and 88% since 2005.

History
Danish development assistance in the 1950s was nearly exclusively channeled through the United Nations. In 1962, Denmark established its first bilateral development assistance programme for developing countries under the Ministry of Foreign Affairs. In 2010, about 40% of Denmark’s bilateral assistance went to social sectors, including education and health. Danida also works in collaboration with the United Nations, the World Bank, regional development banks and the European Union.

See also
 List of development aid agencies
 Australian Agency for International Development
 Canadian International Development Agency
 Department for International Development (UK)
 EuropeAid Development and Cooperation
 French Development Agency
 German International Cooperation
 Irish Aid
 Norwegian Agency for Development Cooperation
 Swedish International Development Cooperation Agency
 Swiss Agency for Development and Cooperation
 United States Agency for International Development

References

External links

December 2011 Annual Report of Danish Ministry of Foreign Affairs
Website of Danish Ministry of Foreign Affairs
NGO's Should Criticise The Basis for the Danish Government's Development Policies

Foreign relations of Denmark
International development agencies
Government agencies of Denmark
1962 establishments in Denmark
Organizations established in 1962